Elevation Point is a bold rock point which forms the western end of the Kukri Hills, overlooking Taylor Glacier in Victoria Land. The name is one of a group in the area associated with surveying applied by New Zealand Geographic Board in 1993.

References 

Headlands of Victoria Land
McMurdo Dry Valleys